Diaethria euclides is a species of butterfly of the genus Diaethria. It was described by Pierre André Latreille in 1809. It is found from eastern Colombia to north-western Venezuela, western Ecuador and Peru.

Subspecies
D. e. euclides (Peru)
D. e. artemis (Röber, 1915) (Colombia)
D. e. gueneei (Röber, 1915) (Ecuador)
D. e. metiscus (Doubleday, 1849) (Venezuela)
D. e. phlogea (Salvin & Godman, 1868) (Colombia)
D. e. phlogeides (Röber, 1915) (Colombia)

References

Biblidinae
Butterflies described in 1809
Nymphalidae of South America
Taxa named by Pierre André Latreille